Trent G. Yawney (born September 29, 1965) is a Canadian professional hockey coach and a former defenceman. He is currently assistant coach for the Los Angeles Kings of the National Hockey League (NHL), and has previously served as the head coach of the Chicago Blackhawks, a professional scout for the Anaheim Ducks, assistant coach with the San Jose Sharks, Edmonton Oilers and the Anaheim Ducks.

Playing career
Yawney played for the Saskatoon J's of the Saskatchewan Junior Hockey League (SJHL), and then the Saskatoon Blades of the Western Hockey League (WHL). Yawney was drafted by the Chicago Blackhawks in the 1984 NHL Entry Draft, third round, 45th overall. After playing with the Canadian national men's hockey team, Yawney played in the NHL for the Blackhawks, Calgary Flames, and St. Louis Blues.

Post-playing career
Yawney was an assistant coach of the Chicago Blackhawks during the 1999–2000 NHL season, then head coach of the Norfolk Admirals in the American Hockey League (AHL) from 2000 to 2005. On July 7, 2005, Yawney was named head coach of the Blackhawks. On November 27, 2006 Yawney was let go and replaced by former player and assistant coach with the Blackhawks Denis Savard. On January 10, 2012 Yawney was named associate head coach of the AHL's Syracuse Crunch. Yawney led the team to a 22-14-2-4 record in the final 42 games to help the Crunch clinch a playoff berth for the first time since 2008.

On April 23, 2018 the Anaheim Ducks announced that they were not renewing Yawney's assistant coach contract.

Personal life
Yawney and his wife Charlane have two children.

Coaching record

NHL

AHL

Career statistics

Regular season and playoffs

International

References

External links

1965 births
Living people
Anaheim Ducks coaches
Anaheim Ducks scouts
Calgary Flames players
Canadian ice hockey coaches
Canadian ice hockey defencemen
Chicago Blackhawks coaches
Chicago Blackhawks draft picks
Chicago Blackhawks players
Edmonton Oilers coaches
Ice hockey people from Saskatchewan
Ice hockey players at the 1988 Winter Olympics
Los Angeles Kings coaches
Olympic ice hockey players of Canada
St. Louis Blues players
San Jose Sharks coaches
Saskatoon Blades players
Sportspeople from Wheaton, Illinois